Colin McIntosh (17 May 1892 – 23 March 1977) was a New Zealand cricketer. He played in one first-class match for Wellington in 1914/15.

See also
 List of Wellington representative cricketers

References

External links
 

1892 births
1977 deaths
New Zealand cricketers
Wellington cricketers
Cricketers from Queensland